Mrse or variant may refer to:

 Mrše, a small village in the municipality of Hrpelje–Kozina in the littoral region of Slovenia
 Mrs.E (鄂), see E (disambiguation)
 MRSE, Methicillin-resistant Staphylococcus epidermidis